Too Cool to Live, Too Smart to Die is a mini-LP by the Canadian garage rock band Deja Voodoo, released by the American label Midnight Records in 1985.  It was reissued in 1988 on the band's label, Og Music, with "dirt-floor mix" remastering, an additional song ("Lonely Motel") and a slightly different track list order.

Track listing
All songs written by Gerard Van Herk, unless otherwise indicated.
1985 Midnight Records release

1988 Og Music release

Personnel
 Tony Dewald - Drums, stomping feet on "Gotta Have Money"
 Gerard Van Herk - Guitar, voice

Notes and references

1985 albums
Deja Voodoo (Canadian band) albums
Og Music albums